Ge Wenjun (born 21 June 2000), is a Chinese footballer who plays as a defender for Spanish side Gran Tarajal. He also serves as club president.

Club career

Early career
Born in Nanjing, Jiangsu, Ge first developed an interest in football after watching the 2010 FIFA World Cup, and in his second year of junior high school, he enrolled at the Evergrande Football School. He joined the academy of professional side Shenzhen in 2016, staying until 2019, before he decided to move to Spain in pursuit of a football career.

Move to Spain
He moved to Avilés, joining local side Real Avilés at the age of nineteen, but only stayed a year before the COVID-19 pandemic in Spain forced him to return to China. He returned to Spain in April 2021, this time signing for La Cuadra-Union Puerto in the Canary Islands. After five appearances in the Tercera División, he moved to Gran Tarajal, who were competing at the same level.

In May 2022, with Gran Tarajal suffering the effects of the COVID-19 pandemic, as well as mismanagement by the former club chairman, Ge was contacted by the chairman to potentially succeed him at the club. After club elections on 19 May 2022, it was decided that Ge would become the new president of the club, at only 22 years of age.

After becoming president, Ge stated in an interview with Red Star News that he would look to "renew contracts, build a competitive team, and achieve our promotion goals" as well as "serve the local fans well and make them happy." He continues to play football, and aims to reach professional level in Spain or Japan.

Career statistics

Club

Notes

References

2000 births
Living people
Sportspeople from Nanjing
Footballers from Jiangsu
Chinese footballers
Association football defenders
Tercera División players
Tercera Federación players
Shenzhen F.C. players
Real Avilés CF footballers
Chinese expatriate footballers
Chinese expatriate sportspeople in Spain
Expatriate footballers in Spain